Ensar (Serbian Cyrillic: Енсар) is a Slavic masculine given name that may refer to the following notable people:
Eno (rapper) (born Ensar Albayrak in 1998), German rapper
Ensar Arifović (born 1980), Bosnian football striker 
Ensar Arslan (born 2001), German football winger
Ensar Bajramlić (born 1997), Serbian football midfielder
Ensar Baykan (born 1992), Turkish football player
Ensar Brunčević (born 1999), Serbian football player
Ensar Hajder (born 1991), Bosnian swimmer